Jinno (written: 神野) is a Japanese surname. Notable people with the surname include:

, Japanese swimmer
, Japanese sprinter
, Japanese footballer

Japanese-language surnames